The Alderney Lighthouse (also known as Mannez Lighthouse) is a stone lighthouse built on the North-East coast of the island of Alderney. It was constructed in 1912 to protect shipping from the dangerous waters of the Alderney Race and the numerous rocks surrounding Alderney.

History

The Alderney Lighthouse was constructed from granite in 1912 under the guidance of local businessman William Baron. It was electrified in 1976, and automated in 1997, when the last resident lighthouse keeper left. The Trinity House Central Planning Unit in Essex controls and maintains the lighthouse.

Before its construction there were several notable wrecks off Alderney, including the Leros. It still functions as a lighthouse, but is open for guided tours during the summer months when it is linked with the rest of the island by the Alderney Railway.

In March 2011 the lighthouse was downgraded. This downgrade meant that the main beam was switched off, the lens shrouded and the light pulse now provided by a pair of LED lamps fixed to the sides of the tower. The fog signal was stopped at the same time.

See also

List of lighthouses in the Channel Islands

References

External links
 Trinity House

Lighthouses completed in 1912
Lighthouses in Alderney
Museums in the Channel Islands
Lighthouse museums in the United Kingdom
1912 establishments in the United Kingdom